Martin Dugard is the name of:

 Martin Dugard (author) (born 1961), American author
 Martin Dugard (speedway rider) (born 1969), former British motorcycle speedway rider

See also
Roger Martin du Gard (1881–1958), French author and winner of the 1937 Nobel Prize for Literature